Louis François de Boufflers, Duke of Boufflers (10 January 1644 – 22 August 1711) was a French soldier. He was created count of Cagny (modern Crillon) and duke of Boufflers and named marshal of France.

Biography
Louis-François was born at Crillon in Oise on 10 January 1644. He entered the army and saw service in 1663 at the siege of Marsal, becoming colonel of dragoons in 1669. In the conquest of Lorraine (1670), he served under the Marshal de Créqui. In the Dutch Republic, he served under Henri de la Tour d'Auvergne, Vicomte de Turenne, frequently distinguishing himself by his skill and bravery; and when Turenne was killed by a cannon shot in 1675, he commanded the rear-guard during the retreat of the French army. He was already a brigadier, and in 1677 he became maréchal de camp.

He served throughout the campaigns of the time with increasing distinction, and in 1681 became lieutenant-general. He commanded the French army on the Moselle, which opened the War of the Grand Alliance with a series of victories. On 15 October 1688, he took the important fortress Mainz, the Aureum caput regni,  with 20,000 soldiers, then he led a corps to the Sambre, and reinforced François Henri de Montmorency, Duke of Piney on the eve of the Battle of Fleurus (1690).

In 1691, he acted as lieutenant-general under the king in person; and during the investment of Mons he was wounded in an attack on the town. He was present with the king at the siege of Namur in 1692, and took part in the victory of Steinkirk. For his services he was raised in 1692 to the rank of Marshal of France, and in 1694 was made a duke.  In 1693, he married Catherine Charlotte de Gramont.

In 1694, he was appointed governor of French Flanders and of the town of Lille. He was besieged in Namur in 1695, and only surrendered to his besiegers after he had lost 8,000 of his 13,000 men. In the conferences which terminated in the Peace of Ryswick he had a principal share.

During the following war (the War of the Spanish Succession), when Lille was threatened with a siege by John Churchill, 1st Duke of Marlborough and Prince Eugène of Savoy, Boufflers was appointed to the command, and made a most gallant resistance of three months.

He was rewarded and honoured by the king for his defence of Lille, as if he had been victorious. It was indeed a species of triumph; his enemy, appreciating his merits, allowed him to dictate his own terms of capitulation. In 1708 he was made a peer of France. In 1709, when the affairs of France were threatened with the most urgent danger, Boufflers offered to serve under his junior, Claude Louis Hector de Villars, Marshal-Duke of Villars, and was with him at the Battle of Malplaquet. Here he displayed the highest skill, and after Villars was wounded he conducted the retreat of the French army without losing either cannon or prisoners. He died at Fontainebleau on 22 August 1711.

Personal life
He married Catherine Charlotte de Gramont, daughter of Antoine Charles de Gramont, Duke of Gramont.They had one son, Joseph Marie de Boufflers, Duke of Boufflers (22 May 1706 - 2 July 1747).

Titles

Notes

References
 
 

1644 births
1711 deaths
People from Oise
Dukes of Boufflers
Counts of Cagny
Marshals of France
French military personnel of the Franco-Dutch War
French military personnel of the Nine Years' War
French army commanders in the War of the Spanish Succession
18th-century peers of France
Peers created by Louis XIV
Knights of the Golden Fleece of Spain